Francois Esterhuyzen (born ) is a South African rugby union player for the Enisei-STM in the Russian Rugby Championship. His regular position is hooker.

Rugby career

Esterhuyzen was born in Somerset West. He made one appearance for the team, in a match against Wales in the 2012 Under-18 International Series.

He then moved to Cape Town to join the  academy, where he played at youth level, as well as representing club side Hamiltons in the 2014 and 2015 editions of the Community Cup.

He helped the Boland Cavaliers to third spot in the competition, securing a place in the 2016 Currie Cup Premier Division. He made his Currie Cup debut in August 2016 – again, in a Round Two match against the Eastern Province Kings – eventually making six appearances in South Africa's premier domestic competition.

References

South African rugby union players
Living people
1994 births
People from Somerset West
Rugby union hookers
Boland Cavaliers players
Rugby union players from the Western Cape